Dennis O. Bythewood (born ) is a United States Space Force brigadier general who serves as the commander of Joint Task Force–Space Defense.

Education 
 1992 Bachelor of Science in Electrical Engineering, University of Vermont, Burlington, VT.
 1998 Squadron Officer School, Maxwell AFB, AL.
 2003 Air Command and Staff College (correspondence), Maxwell AFB, AL.
 2004 Master of Business Administration, University of Colorado-Colorado Springs, CO.
 2007 Air War College (correspondence), Maxwell AFB, AL.

Military career 

Bythewood served as the director for special programs of the Space and Missile Systems Center. He was nominated in January 2021 for promotion to brigadier general and transfer to the United States Space Force.

Assignments 

1. October 1992 – June 1996, Range System Manager, 501st Range Squadron, Hill AFB, UT
2. July 1996 – August 1999, Electric Combat Analyst and Chief, Unmanned Air Vehicle Branch, Detachment 1, 31st Test and Evaluation Squadron, Kirtland AFB, NM
3. August 1999 – June 2002, Chief, Test and Certification, System Test Division, Milstar Joint Program Office, Los Angeles AFB, CA
4. July 2002 – October 2005, Chief of Engineering, Operations Support Flight Commander and Operations Officer, 4th Space Operations Squadron, Schriever AFB, CO
5. November 2005 – July 2007, Chief, MILSATCOM Operations Branch, HAF/DCS, Air, Space and Information Operations, Plans, Requirements, Pentagon, Washington, D.C.
6. August 2007 – May 2009, Executive Officer, SAF/SO, Air Forces Smart Operations, Pentagon, Washington, D.C.
7. June 2009 – June 2011, Commander, Space Communications Operations Squadron, Network Operations Group, Mission Operations Directorate, National Reconnaissance Office, Los Angeles, CA
8. July 2011 – July 2013, Materiel Leader, Space Based Infrared System Production, Infrared Space Systems Directorate, Space and Missile Systems Center, Los Angeles AFB, CA
9. August 2013 – June 2014, Director, Ground Frontiers Office, Ground Enterprise Directorate, National Reconnaissance Office, Chantilly, VA
10. July 2014 – June 2016, Commander, 50th Operations Group, Schriever AFB, CO
11. July 2016 – December 2016, Special Assistant to the Director, Remote Sensing Systems Directorate, Los Angeles AFB, CA
12. December 2016 – October 2018, Senior Materiel Leader & Director, Remote Sensing Systems Directorate, Los Angeles AFB, CA
13. October 2018 – July 2020, Director, Space Development Corps and Program Executive Officer for Space Development, Los Angeles AFB, CA
14. July 2020 – June 2021, Senior Materiel Leader and Director, Special Programs, Space and Missile Systems Center, Los Angeles AFB, Calif.
15. July 2021 – November 2022, Deputy Commander, Joint Task Force-Space Defense, U.S. Space Command Schriever AFB, Colo.
15. November 2022 – Present, Commander, Joint Task Force-Space Defense, U.S. Space Command Schriever AFB, Colo.

Personal life 
Bythewood married Jahnna Perkin on October 24, 1998

Awards and decorations 
Bythewood is the recipient of the following awards:

Dates of promotion

References 

Living people
Year of birth missing (living people)
Place of birth missing (living people)
United States Air Force colonels
United States Space Force generals